Żagiew ("The Torch", Die Fackel), also known as Żydowska Gwardia Wolności (the "Jewish Freedom Guard"), was a Nazi-collaborationist Jewish agent-provocateur group in German-occupied Poland, founded and sponsored by the Germans and led by Abraham Gancwajch.

Operations
Many Żagiew members were related to the collaborationist Jewish organization Group 13, which was also led by Gancwajch. The organization operated primarily within the Warsaw Ghetto. Żagiew was established in late 1940 and existed until the Ghetto's elimination during the 1943 Warsaw Ghetto Uprising.

Żagiew had over a thousand Jewish secret agents and some were permitted by their Gestapo handlers to possess firearms.

Żagiew's prime goal was to infiltrate the Jewish resistance network and reveal its connections with the Polish underground that aided and hid Jews in the General Government. The organization was able to inflict considerable damage on both fronts. Żagiew agents were also instrumental in organizing the Hotel Polski affair, in Warsaw, a German scheme to lure thousands of wealthy Jews, under false promises of evacuation to South America, into a trap and extort their money and valuables before killing most of them.

See also
Chaim Rumkowski
Group 13

Notes

Poland in World War II
Jewish collaboration with Nazi Germany
Jewish Polish history
1940 establishments in Poland
1943 disestablishments in Poland